Salima Machamba (1 November 1874, Fomboni – 7 August 1964, Pesmes) was sultan of Mohéli (Mwali) in 1888–1909. Her official paternal name was Salima Machamba bint Saidi Hamadi Makadara. She was a relative of Ranavalona I, Queen of Madagascar.

Life
Salima Machamba was born on 1 November 1874 in Fomboni, to Jumbe Fatima bint Abderremane, Queen (Sultan) of Mohéli (Mwali) and Emile Fleuriot de Langle (1837–1881), a great-grandson of Paul Antoine Fleuriot de Langle. She was born out of wedlock, but officially bore the name of her mother's husband and was recognised as Salima Machamba bint Saidi Hamadi Makadara.  

She was chosen as puppet queen of Mohéli by the French, who made Comoros a French protectorate. She fell in love with and married on 28 August 1901 Camille Paule, a French gendarme,in Saint Denis, Réunion. In 1909 she was deposed by the French government and Comoros was annexed by France. 

She was deported with her family to France. She gave birth to three children. The French government provided her a yearly allowance of 3,000 gold Francs. She lived as a simple farmer in Haute-Saône, and died in Pesmes on 7 August 1964. She was buried at L'église Saint-Hilaire, Pesmes on 10 August 1964. Her granddaughter Anne Etter represents the royal family of Mohéli in Comoros as the president of Association Développement des Iles Comores.

Children 
From her marriage to Camille Paule (1 March 1867, Pesmes – 22 September 1946, Champagney, Jura), three children:
 Henriette Camille Ursule Louise Paule (15 July 1902, Cléry, Côte-d'Or − 4 April 1989, Dijon), Princess of Mohéli, she has a daughter:
 Christiane
 Louis Camille Paule (1 September 1907, Cléry, Côte-d'Or − 8 April 1983, Dole, Jura), Prince of Mohéli, he has a daughter:
 Anne Ursule Etter (born 1941), President of Association Développement des Iles Comores, wife of Jean–François Etter
 Prince Camille Fernand Paule (16 June 1917, Cléry, Côte-d'Or − 1 April 2007, Dijon), Prince of Mohéli

Notes

Bibliography
 Nivois, Julienne: A Pesmes, en Franche-Comté..., Une Reine oubliée par l'Histoire, Éditions Dominique Guéniot, Paris, 1995.

External links
 Comores/Ursule Salima Machamba 1ère, Dernière reine de Mohéli (Access date: 27 October 2014)
 Habari Za Komori/Ursule Salima Machamba 1ère, Dernière reine de Mohéli (Access date: 27 October 2014)
 Rulers/Salima Machamba (Access date: 27 October 2011)

1874 births
1964 deaths
Comorian people of Malagasy descent
Queens regnant of Mohéli
History of the Comoros
Merina people
Monarchs who abdicated
Sultans of Mohéli
Illegitimate children of monarchs
19th-century women rulers
20th-century women rulers
19th-century rulers in Africa
20th-century rulers in Africa